The 2015–16 season was Blackpool F.C.'s 107th season in the Football League, and their first season back in League One following relegation from the 2014–15 Football League Championship. Along with competing in League One, the club also participated in the FA Cup, League Cup and Football League Trophy. The season covered the period from 1 July 2015 to 30 June 2016.

The club was managed by Neil McDonald, in his first season in charge. Following Blackpool's relegation to League Two at the end of the season,  McDonald left his role as Blackpool manager.

Blackpool finished 22nd in League One and were relegated for the second-successive season. They will play the 2016–17 campaign in League Two, their first time playing in the bottom division of English professional football in fifteen years.

They were also knocked out of both the FA Cup and League up at the first-round stage.

Transfers

Transfers in

Transfers out

Loans in

Loans out

Competitions

Pre-season friendlies

League One

Table

League Cup

FA Cup

Football League Trophy

Lancashire Senior Cup

Top scorers

References

Blackpool
Blackpool F.C. seasons